Bengt Simonson (born 8 October 1945) is a Swedish football manager.

Career
Simonsson began his managerial career with Dingtuna GIF and IFK Västerås, before becoming coach of the Gideonsbergs IF women's team of the Damallsvenskan in 1990. In 1992, he became the manager of the Sweden women's national team, coaching the team at the 1995 FIFA Women's World Cup and 1996 Summer Olympics.

References

External links
 
 
 Bengt Simonsson at Soccerdonna.de 

1945 births
Living people
Sportspeople from Västerås
Swedish football managers
Women's association football managers
Sweden women's national football team managers
1995 FIFA Women's World Cup managers